John Lawrence Smith (September 20, 1816 – March 17, 1889) was an American lawyer, politician, and judge from New York.

Life 
Smith was born on September 20, 1816 in Nissequogue, New York, the son of Richard Smith and Eliza Willett Nicoll. His maternal great-grandfather was General Nathaniel Woodhull and his maternal great-grandmother was the sister of Declaration of Independence signer William Floyd.

Smith attended the Clinton Academy in East Hampton. He then went to Yale College, where his classmates included Samuel J. Tilden, William M. Evarts, Edwards Pierrepont, Morrison Waite, William W. Eaton, and Benjamin D. Silliman. In 1833, he went to Princeton College and graduated from there in 1837. He then studied law in the office of John L. Lawrence in New York City. He was admitted to the bar in 1840, and he initially practiced law in New York City. In 1844, he moved to Smithtown.

In 1846, Smith was elected to the New York State Assembly as one of the two representatives of Suffolk County. He served in the Assembly in 1847. He was the Democratic candidate for Speaker that year, losing to Whig William C. Hasbrouck. In 1856, he was elected district attorney of Suffolk County. In 1858, he became county judge. In 1862, he was re-elected county judge and surrogate as a Democrat even while the county went Republican. After his term as judge expired, he returned to his law practice. In the last few years of his life, he was mostly retired from law.

A prominent member of the Episcopal Church in Long Island, Smith served as the first junior warden of the Caroline Church in Setauket. His wife was the niece of Alexander T. Stewart, who adopted her as his daughter and bequeathed her a large fortune. Smith's last public appearance was in the Stewart will contest, when he provided uncomplimentary testimony in regards to Henry Hilton's management of Stewart's fortune. He was the largest landowner in the county and possibly its wealthiest, with an estate estimated as being worth a million dollars when he died.

In 1845, Smith married Sarah Nicoll Clinch of New York City. Their children were Cornelia (who married lawyer Prescott Hall Butler and resided at By-the-Harbor), Louise Nicoll (who married lawyer Frank Sayre Osborne), Kate Annette (who married Episcopal Reverend Joseph Bloomfield Wetherill), Bessie Springs (who married architect Stanford White and was the mother of architect Lawrence Grant White), and Ella Batavia (who married Devereux Emmet), and James Clinch. James was a lawyer and member of Mrs. Astor's 400 who married musician Bertha Ludington Barnes of Chicago, witnessed his brother-in-law Stanford White's murder, and died on the Titanic. One of Smith's great-grandchildren was lawyer and assemblyman Prescott B. Huntington.

Smith died of pneumonia at his city residence in New York City on March 17, 1889. He was buried in the Episcopal Church in St. James.

References

External links 

 The Political Graveyard
 J. Lawrence Smith at Find a Grave

1816 births
1889 deaths
Politicians from Suffolk County, New York
Suffolk County district attorneys
People from Smithtown, New York
Yale College alumni
Princeton University alumni
19th-century American lawyers
Lawyers from New York City
New York (state) state court judges
19th-century American politicians
Democratic Party members of the New York State Assembly
19th-century American judges
County judges in the United States
19th-century American Episcopalians
Deaths from pneumonia in New York City
Burials in New York (state)